Juan Olabarri (5 July 1936 – 17 November 2018) was a Spanish sailor. He competed in the Finn event at the 1964 Summer Olympics.

References

External links
 

1936 births
2018 deaths
Spanish male sailors (sport)
Olympic sailors of Spain
Sailors at the 1964 Summer Olympics – Finn
Sportspeople from Getxo
Sportspeople from Biscay
Sailors (sport) from the Basque Country (autonomous community)